Borovak pri Polšniku is a small settlement in the  Municipality of Litija in central Slovenia. The area is part of the traditional region of Lower Carniola. It is now included with the rest of the municipality in the Central Sava Statistical Region; until January 2014 the municipality was part of the Central Slovenia Statistical Region.

Name
Borovak pri Polšniku was attested in written sources as Borauackh in 1499.  The name of the settlement was changed from Borovak to Borovak pri Polšniku in 1955.

References

External links

Borovak pri Polšniku on Geopedia

Populated places in the Municipality of Litija